Phu Quoc Airport may be one of these below airport
 Duong Dong Airport The closed airport which was used to serve Phu Quoc Island in the past
 Phu Quoc International Airport is an international airport which was completed in 2012 on Phú Quốc Island, southern Vietnam. It's the airport serving Phu Quoc at this time.